Frederic Wallis (1854 – 24 June 1928) was an Anglican priest.

Biography
Frederic Wallis was born in Hastings, the son of Joseph Wallis, MA. He was educated at St Paul's and Gonville and Caius College, Cambridge (whence he gained his MA Cantab). Ordained in 1876, he became Dean of Caius in 1878 and a Lecturer in Divinity Lecturer at Cambridge. In 1895 he was appointed to the colonial episcopate as Bishop of Wellington, a post he held for 16 years before retirement in 1911. On his return to the UK, he was Archdeacon of Wilts (1911–1912), a Canon at Salisbury Cathedral (1913 onwards) and Archdeacon of Sherborne (1916–1919). Having become a Doctor of Divinity (DD), he died in Bournemouth, and is buried at Littlebredy.

Legacy
A memorial labyrinth named in honor of Wallis and his wife Margaret is located at Hutt Hospital in Wellington, New Zealand.

References

1853 births
People from Hastings
People educated at St Paul's School, London
Fellows of Gonville and Caius College, Cambridge
19th-century Anglican bishops in New Zealand
20th-century Anglican bishops in New Zealand
Anglican bishops of Wellington
Archdeacons of Sherborne
Archdeacons of Wilts
1928 deaths
Burials in Dorset